This list contains a selection of books on World War I, using APA style citations.

Reference works
 
 Ellis, Robert, John, and Mike Cox. The World War I Databook: The Essential Facts and Figures for All the Combatants (2002)
 Encyclopædia Britannica (12th ed. 1922) comprises the 11th edition plus three new volumes 30-31-32 that cover events since 1911 with very thorough coverage of the war as well as every country and colony. partly online in ascii, with guide to article titles
 full text of vol 30 ABBE to ENGLISH HISTORY
 scans of each page of vol 30-31-32
 Herman, Gerald. The Pivotal Conflict: A Comprehensive Chronology of the First World War, 1914-1919 (1992) 824pp online
 Higham, Robin and Dennis E. Showalter, eds. Researching World War I: A Handbook (2003), highly detailed historiography, stressing military themes; annotates over 1000 books
 Hirschfeld, Gerhard, Gerd Krumeich and Irina Renz, eds. Brill's Encyclopedia of the First World War. (2012) . 1105 pgs. (2 vol.) international scope: showcasing the work of recognized World War I experts from 15 countries google books link
 Horne, John, ed. (2012). A Companion to World War I. West Sussex: Wiley-Blackwell. 
 March, Francis Andrew and Richard Joseph Beamish History of the World War: An Authentic Narrative of the World's Greatest War (1919), popular contemporary history. 
 Paxson, Frederic Logan et al. War cyclopedia: a handbook for ready reference on the great war (1918) online edition
 
 
 Tucker, Spencer, ed. The Encyclopedia of World War I: A Political, Social, and Military History (5 vol 2005), online at eBook.com, the most detailed reference source; articles by specialists cover all aspects of the war
 Tucker, Spencer, ed. European Powers in the First World War: An Encyclopedia (1999)
 Winter, Jay, ed. (2014). The Cambridge History of the First World War (3 vol. Cambridge University Press, 2014) online review

Atlases and maps
 Banks, Arthur (2001). A Military Atlas of the First World War. Barnsley: Leo Cooper reprinted by Pen & Sword. 
 Bekers, Willem, and Ronald De Meyer. "War on scale: models for the First World War battlefront." in The intellectual response to the first world war: how the conflict impacted on ideas, methods and fields of enquiry (Sussex Academic Press, 2017) pp. 185–204. online
 Chasseaud, Peter. Mapping the first world war (HarperCollins UK, 2013).
 Espenhorst, Jürgen. "A good map is half the battle! The military cartography of the central powers in World War I." in History of military cartography (Springer, Cham, 2016) pp. 83–130.
 Espenhorst, Jürgen. "The Eye of the Army: German Aircraft and Aero Cartography in World War I." in History of Military Cartography (Springer, Cham, 2016) pp. 61–82.
 Esposito, Vincent J. The West Point Atlas of American Wars: 1900-1918 (1997) despite the title covers entire war; online maps from this atlas
 Gregory, Derek. "Gabriel's map: Cartography and corpography in modern war." in Geographies of knowledge and power (Springer, Dordrecht, 2015) pp. 89–121.
 Hammond's frontier atlas of the world war: containing large scale maps of all the battle fronts of Europe and Asia, together with a military map of the United States (1916) online free
 Kaufmann, H. W., and J. E. Kaufmann. Verdun 1916: The Renaissance of the Fortress (Pen and Sword, 2016).
 Alexandru Averescu - Marschall, Politiker, Legende, von Petre Otu. Lektor Verlag. Hainburg. 2012. ISBN 9783941866027 
 Durchleuchtung eines Verrats. Der Fall des Oberst Alexandru D. Sturdza, von Petre Otu und Maria Georgescu. Lektor Verlag. 2022. Hainburg. ISBN 9783941866089

Overviews
 Beckett, Ian F. W. (2007). The Great War: 1914-1918. New York: Routledge.  A thematic and comprehensive history which provides a complete picture of the war.
 Carver, Field Marshal Lord. War Lords. (1976) Includes brief bios of Hamilton, Foch, Haig, Falkenhayn
 Clare, John D., First World War (1994)
 Cruttwell, C. R. M. F. A History of the Great War, 1914-1918 (1934), general military history online free
 Evans, David. Teach yourself— the First World War. (Hodder Arnold, 2004)
 Falls, Cyril. The Great War (1960), general military history
 Gerwarth, Robert, and Erez Manela. "The Great War as a Global War: Imperial Conflict and the Reconfiguration of World Order, 1911–1923." Diplomatic History 38.4 (2014): 786–800. online
 Gerwarth, Robert, and Erez Manela, eds. Empires at War: 1911-1923 (2014), 12 very wide-ranging essays by scholars. excerpt
 Gilbert, Martin (2004). The First World War: A Complete History. New York: Holt 
 Halpern, Paul G. A Naval History of World War I (1995)
 
 
 Hart, Peter (2013). The Great War: A Combat History of the First World War. Oxford and New York: Oxford University Press. 
 Herwig, Holger H. (2009). The First World War: Germany and Austria-Hungary 1914-1918. New York: Bloomsbury Academic. 
 Herwig, Holger H. and Neil Heyman. Biographical Dictionary of World War I (1982), scholarly sketches of the main military and political leaders of every country.
 Hochschild, Adam (2012). To End All Wars: A Story of Loyalty and Rebellion, 1914-1918. Boston and New York: Mariner Books. 
 Howard, Michael. The First World War: A Very Short Introduction (2007), by a leading historian excerpt and text search
 Hubatsch, Walther. Germany and the Central Powers in the World War, 1914-1918 (1963)
 
 Keegan, John (2000). The First World War. New York: Vintage. 
 
 
 Liddell-Hart, Basil H. (2012). World War I in Outline. Yardley, PA: Westholme Publishing. 
 Morrow Jr., John H.. The Great War: An Imperial History (2003), covers British Empire excerpt and text search
 
 
 Philpott, William (2014). War of Attrition: Fighting the First World War. New York: Overlook Press. 
 Robbins, Keith. The First World War (1993), very short overview
 Simkins, Peter, Geoffrey Jukes, and Michael Hickey (2003). The First World War: The War to End All Wars. Foreword by Hew Strachan. Oxford: Osprey Publishing. 
 Stevenson, David. Cataclysm: The First World War As Political Tragedy (2004) major reinterpretation, 560pp
 Stokesbury, James. A Short History of World War I (1981)
 Storey, William K. (2010). First World War: A Concise Global History. Blue Ridge Summit, PA: Rowman & Littlefield Publishers. 
 Strachan, Hew. The First World War: Volume I: To Arms (2004): a major scholarly synthesis. Thorough coverage of 1914–16; 1245pp
 Strachan, Hew. The First World War (2004): a 385pp overview
 Strohn, Matthias, ed. (2013). World War I Companion. Osprey Publishing. 
 Tucker, Spencer C. (1998). Great War, 1914–18. London: UCL Press. 
 Winter, J. M. The Experience of World War I (2nd ed 2005), topical essays;

Primary sources, documents and year books
 Collins, Ross F. ed. World War I: Primary Documents on Events from 1914 to 1919 (Debating Historical Issues in the Media of the Time) (2007) West Port, CN; London: Greenwood Press 425pp , 
 Gooch, G. P. Recent Revelations Of European Diplomacy (1940), 475pp summarizes memoirs of major participants
 Gooch, G. P. & Harold Temperley, eds. British Documents on the Origins of the War 1898-1914 Volume XI, the Outbreak of War Foreign Office Documents (1926) online
 French Ministry of Foreign Affairs, The French Yellow Book: Diplomatic Documents (1914)
 Mombauer, Annika (2013). The Origins of the First World War: Diplomatic and Military Documents. Manchester and London: Manchester University Press. 
 Hazell's Annual for 1916 (1916), worldwide events of 1915; 640pp online; worldwide coverage of 1915 events; emphasis on Great Britain
 New International Year Book 1914 (1915), Comprehensive coverage of world and national affairs for year 1914, 913pp
 New International Year Book 1915 (1916), Comprehensive coverage of world and national affairs, 791pp
 New International Year Book 1916 (1917), Comprehensive coverage of world and national affairs, 938pp
 New International Year Book 1917 (1918), Comprehensive coverage of world and national affairs, 904 pp
 New International Year Book 1918 (1919), Comprehensive coverage of world and national affairs, 904 pp
 New International Year Book 1919 (1920), Comprehensive coverage of world and national affairs, 744pp
 New International Year Book 1920 (1921), Comprehensive coverage of world and national affairs, 844 pp
 New International Year Book 1921 (1922), Comprehensive coverage of world and national affairs, 848 pp
 Shevin-Coetzee, Marilyn (2010). World War I: A History in Documents. (Oxford University Press).

Official histories
Countries on both sides of the conflict published official histories, including the following:
 
  (16 volumes)
  (39 volumes)
  (106 volumes)
  (12 volumes)
  (18 volumes)
  (15 volumes)
  (single volume)
  (7 volumes)

Causes and diplomacy

 Albertini, Luigi. The Origins of the War of 1914. New updated edition with an introduction by Samuel R. Williamson. 3-vol. paperback set (New York: Enigma Books, 2005) 
 Albertini, Luigi. The Origins of the War of 1914 (vol 2 1952). vol 2 online covers July 1914
 Aksakal, Mustafa. "The Ottoman Road to War in 1914: The Ottoman Empire and the First World War." (Cambridge: Cambridge University Press, 2010). 
 Barnes, Harry Elmer. The Genesis Of The World War (1927), revisionist; argues Germany was not guilty
 Chakraborty, Kaushik. Relocating the Origins of the First World War: Imperialism, Finance, Capital, Socialism, Nationalism, Power Rivalry, War Aims and War Guilt or Kriegeschuldfrage (1870-1914) (2008)
 Clark, Christopher (2014). The Sleepwalkers: How Europe Went to War in 1914. New York: Harper Books. 
 Evans, R. J. W. and Hartmut Pogge Von Strandman, eds. The Coming of the First World War (1990), essays by scholars from both sides
 Fay, Sidney. The Origins Of The World War (2nd ed 1930) vol 1 online; vol1 and 2 online
  (original German title "Krieg der Illusionen die deutsche Politik von 1911 - 1914")
  (original German title "Griff nach der Weltmacht: Die Kriegzielpolitik des kaiserlichen Deutschland 1914/18")
 Fromkin, D. Europe's Last Summer. Who started the Great War in 1914? (2004), popular
 Gilpin, Robert. War and Change in World Politics (1981)
 Gooch, G.P. History of modern Europe, 1878-1919 (2nd ed. 1956) pp 386–413. online, diplomatic history
 Gooch, G.P. Before the war: studies in diplomacy (2 vol 1936, 1938) online long scholarly chapters on Britain's Landsdowne; France's Théophile Delcassé; Germany's Bernhard von Bülow pp 187–284; Russia's Alexander Izvolsky 285–365; and Austria' Aehrenthal pp 366–438. vol 2: Grey, 1–133; Poincaré, 135–200; Bethmann Hollweg, 201–85; Sazonoff, 287–369; Berchtold, 371–447. vol 2 online
 Hamilton, Richard F. and Holger H. Herwig, eds. Decisions for War, 1914-1917 (2004), scholarly essays on Serbia, Austria-Hungary, Germany, Russia, France, Britain, Japan, Ottoman Empire, Italy, the United States, Bulgaria, Romania, and Greece.
 
 Henig, Ruth B. (1993). The Origins of the First World War. Florence, KY: Routledge. 
 Hewitson, Mark (2004). Germany and the Causes of the First World War. Oxford: Berg Publishers. 
 Horne, John, ed. A Companion to World War I (2012) 38 topics essays by scholars
 Joll, James, The Origins of the First World War (1984)
 Kennan, George (1984). The Fateful Alliance: France, Russia, and the Coming of the First World War. New York: Pantheon Books. 
 Kennedy, Paul M., ed. The War Plans of the Great Powers, 1880-1914. (1979)
 Kennedy, Paul M. The Rise of the Anglo-German Antagonism, 1860-1914 (1981)
 Knutsen, Torbjørn L. The Rise and Fall of World Orders Manchester University Press, 1999
 Lee, Dwight E. ed. The Outbreak of the First World War: Who Was Responsible? (1958), readings from multiple points of view
 McCullough, Edward E. How The First World War Began (1999)
 McMeekin, Sean (2011). Russian Origins of the First World War. Cambridge, MA: Harvard University Press. 
 Mombauer, Annika (2013). The Origins of the First World War: Diplomatic and Military Documents. Manchester and London: Manchester University Press. 
 Mulligan, William (2010). The Origins of the First World War. Cambridge and New York: Cambridge University Press. 
 Neilson, Francis. How Diplomats Make War (1916)
 Nock, Albert Jay. The Myth of a Guilty Nation. B.W. Huebsch, Incorporated, 1922.
 Ponting, Clive. Thirteen Days: Diplomacy and Disaster - The Countdown to the Great War (2002)
 
 Remak, Joachim (1995). The Origins of World War I, 1871-1914. San Diego: Harcourt Brace. 
 Ross, Stewart, Causes and Consequences of the First World War (2003).
 Sontag, Raymond James. European Diplomatic History 1871-1932 (1933) online free pp 99–254.
 Spender, J.A. Fifty years of Europe: a study in pre-war documents (1933) covers 1871 to 1914, 438pp
 Stevenson, David, The First World War and International Politics (2005)
 Taylor, A.J.P. The Struggle for Mastery in Europe 1848–1918 (1954) online free
 Tuchman, Barbara. The Guns of August (1962) a best seller
 
 Vyvyan, J. M. K. "The Approach of the War of 1914." in C. L. Mowat, ed. The New Cambridge Modern History: Vol. XII: The Shifting Balance of World Forces 1898-1945 (2nd ed. 1968) online pp 140–70.
 Zametica, John. Folly and Malice: The Habsburg Empire, the Balkans and the Start of World War One (2017) excerpt

Allied Forces

Britain
 French, David. British Strategy and War Aims 1914-1916 (Routledge, 2014) 
 Holmes, Richard. Tommy: the British soldier on the Western Front, 1914-1918 (Marshall Pickering, 2004) 
 Messenger, Charles. Call To Arms: The British Army 1914-1918 (2005) 
 Pegler, Martin. British Tommy 1914-18 (1996) 
 Sheffield, Gary D. Leadership in the Trenches: Officer-Man Relations, Morale, and Discipline in the British Army in the Era of the First World War (St. Martin's Press, 2000) 
 Watson, Alexander. Enduring the Great War: Combat, morale and collapse in the German and British armies, 1914–1918 (Cambridge University Press, 2008)

Australia and New Zealand

 
 Davison, Graeme, John Hirst, and Stuart Macintyre, eds. The Oxford Companion to Australian History (2001)  Online at OUP
 Grey, Jeffrey. A military history of Australia (Cambridge University Press, 1st ed: 1999; 3rd ed: 2008 )
 Pugsley, Christopher. The Anzac Experience: New Zealand, Australia and Empire in the First World War (2004)

Canada
 Berton, Pierre. Marching As To War, Canada's Turbulent Years 1899-1953 (2001), ch 2; Popular narrative
 Cook, Tim. "Quill and Canon: Writing the Great War in Canada," American Review of Canadian Studies, Vol. 35, 2005 online edition
 Dickson, Paul Douglas. A Thoroughly Canadian General: A Biography of General H.D.G. Crerar (2007) excerpt and text search
 Granatstein, Jack, and J.M. Hitsman, Broken Promises: A History of Conscription in Canada (1977)
 Hunter, Mark C. To Employ and Uplift Them: The Newfoundland Naval Reserve, 1899-1926 (2009)
 Milner, Marc. Canadian Military History. Toronto: Copp Clark Putnam, 1993. Includes problems of Canadian recruiting and the 1917 draft crisis (with its problems over Quebec)
 Morton, Desmond, and J. L. Granatstein Marching to Armageddon: Canadians and the Great War 1914-1919 (1989)

 Vance, Jonathan F. Death So Noble: Memory, Meaning, and the First World War (1997), cultural history; online edition
 Wade, Mason. The French Canadians, 1760-1945 (1955), ch 12

Africa, South Africa
 
 
 
 Miller, Charles. Battle for the Bundu: the First World War in East Africa. New York: Macmillan Publishing Co., 1974.

India

China
 Xingqing, Gu. Ou zhan gong zuo hui yi lu (欧战工作回忆录; Reminiscences on my work during the European War) (1937).

France
 Adamthwaite, Anthony. Grandeur And Misery: France's Bid for Power in Europe, 1914-1940 (1995) pp 1–39
 Bonzon, Thierry. "Consumption and Total Warfare in Paris (1914–1918)." in F. Trentmann and F. Just, eds. Food and Conflict in Europe in the Age of the Two World Wars (2006) pp. 49–64. online
 Bruce, Robert Bowman. A Fraternity of Arms: America and France in the Great War (UP of Kansas, 2003).
 Cabanes Bruno. August 1914: France, the Great War, and a Month That Changed the World Forever (2016) argues that the very first month of fighting transformed the French mind.
 Clayton, Anthony. Paths of Glory: the French Army 1914-18 (London: Cassell, 2003)
 Dutton, David. The Politics of Diplomacy: Britain, France and the Balkans in the First World War (1998).
 Fogarty, Richard S. Race and war in France: Colonial subjects in the French army, 1914–1918 (Johns Hopkins University Press, 2008)
 Fridenson, Patrick. The French home front, 1914-1918 (Berg, 1992).
 Greenhalgh, Elizabeth. Victory through Coalition: Britain and France during the First World War (Cambridge University Press, 2005) 304pp
Greenhalgh, Elizabeth, The French Army and the First World War (Armies of the Great War) (Cambridge University Press, 2014), 486 p, ISBN 978-1107605688
Goya, Michel. Flesh and Steel During the Great War: The Transformation of the French Army and the Invention of Modern Warfare, (Pen and Sword Military, 2018) - 
 Keiger, John. France and the Origins of the First World War (1985) online
 Smith, Leonard V. Between Mutiny and Obedience: the Case of the French Fifth Infantry Division during World War I (Princeton University Press, 1994)
 Smith, Leonard V. The Embattled Self: French Soldiers' Testimony of the Great War (2014) Excerpt and text search
 Smith, Leonard V. et al. France and the Great War (2003) 222pp; excerpt and text search
 
 Stovall, Tyler. Paris and the spirit of 1919: consumer struggles, transnationalism and revolution (2012).
 Sumner, Ian. The French Army 1914-18 (1995) excerpt and text search
 Sumner, Ian. They Shall Not Pass: The French Army on the Western Front 1914-1918 (2012)
 Winter, Jay, and Jean-Louis Robert. Capital Cities at War: Paris, London, Berlin 1914-1919 (2 vol Cambridge UP, 1997, 2007). online review

Historiography
 Cox Gary. "France" in Robin Higham and Dennis E. Showalter, eds. Researching World War I: A Handbook (2003) pp 51–78.

Italy
 Ferrari, Paolo. "The Memory And Historiography Of The First World War In Italy" Comillas Journal of International Relations (2015) #2 pp 117–126 [ISSN 2386-5776] DOI: cir.i02.y2015.009 online
 Gibelli, Antonio. La Grande Guerra degli italiani, 1915-1918, Milano, Sansoni (1998)
 Gooch, John. The Italian army and the first world war (Cambridge University Press, 2014).
 
 Page, Thomas N. Italy and the World War, New York, Charles Scribner's Sons Full Text Available Online (1920)
 Pergher, Roberta. "An Italian War? War and Nation in the Italian Historiography of the First World War" Journal of Modern History (Dec 2018) 90#4
 Renzi, William A. In the Shadow of the Sword: Italy's Neutrality and Entrance Into the Great War, 1914-1915 (1987).
 Thompson, Mark. The White War: Life and Death on the Italian Front, 1915-1919 excerpt and text search (2009)

Japan
 Best, Antony, and Oliviero Frattolillo, eds. Japan and the Great War. (Palgrave, 2015). online
 Dickinson, Frederick R. War and National Reinvention: Japan in the Great War, 1914-1919 (Harvard Univ Asia Center, 1999).
 Duus, Peter, ed. The Cambridge history of Japan: The twentieth century (Cambridge University Press, 1989).
 Saxon, Timothy D. "Anglo-Japanese Naval Cooperation, 1914–1918." Naval War College Review, 53#1 (2000): 62–92.
 Strachan, Hew. The First World War: Volume I: To Arms (Oxford University Press, 2003) 455–94.

Russia

 Acton, Edward, V. et al. eds. Critical companion to the Russian Revolution, 1914-1921 (Indiana UP, 1997).
 
 
 Engelstein, Laura. Russia in Flames: War, Revolution, Civil War, 1914-1921 (Oxford UP, 2018).
 Gatrell, Peter. Russia's First World War: A social and economic history (Pearson Education, 2005).
 Lincoln, W. Bruce. Passage Through Armageddon: The Russians in War and Revolution, 1914-1918 (1986).
 Marshall, Alex. "Russian military intelligence, 1905-1917: The untold story behind tsarist Russia in the First World War." War in History 11.4 (2004): 393–423.
 Neilson, Keith. Strategy and Supply: The Anglo-Russian Alliance 1914-1917 (Routledge, 2014).
 Read, Christopher. War and revolution in Russia, 1914-22: the collapse of Tsarism and the establishment of Soviet power (Macmillan International Higher Education, 2012).
 Rutherford, Ward. The Tsar's War, 1914-1917: The Story of the Imperial Russian Army in the First World War (Faulkner, 1992).

United States
 Selected photos available online through the Washington State Library's Classics in Washington History collection
 Maps available online through the Washington State Office of the Secretary of State's Washington History collection
 Ayres, Leonard P, The War with Germany: A Statistical Summary Government Printing Office, 1919 full text online
 Ball, Gregory W. They Called Them Soldier Boys: A Texas Infantry Regiment in World War I (University of North Texas Press, 2013) 
 Beaver, Daniel R. Newton D. Baker and the American War Effort, 1917-1919 (1966)
 
 Chambers, John W., II. To Raise an Army: The Draft Comes to Modern America (1987) 
 
 
 Elson, Aaron. The Armored Fist: The 712th Tank Battalion in the Second World War (Fonthill Media, 2014) 
 
 Hallas, James H. Doughboy War: The American Expeditionary Force in World War I (2000) 
 Howarth, Stephen. To Shining Sea: A History of the United States Navy, 1775-1991 (1991) 
 , covers politics & economics & society
 Koistinen, Paul. Mobilizing for Modern War: The Political Economy of American Warfare, 1865-1919 (1997) 
 
 
 Shay, Michael E. Sky Pilots: The Yankee Division Chaplains in World War I (University of Missouri Press, 2014) 
 Titus, James, ed. The Home Front and War in the Twentieth Century: The American Experience in Comparative Perspective (1984) essays by scholars. online free
 Trask, David F. The United States in the Supreme War Council: American War Aims and Inter-Allied Strategy, 1917-1918 (1961)
 
 Venzon, Anne ed. The United States in the First World War: An Encyclopedia (1995) 
 Woodward, David. The American Army and the First World War (Cambridge University Press, 2014) 
 Woodward, David ed. America and World War I: A Selected Annotated Bibliography of English-Language Sources (2nd ed. 2007) excerpt

Germany and the Central Powers
 
 
 
 Hall, Richard C. "'The Enemy is Behind Us': The Morale Crisis in the Bulgarian Army during the Summer of 1918," War in History, (April 2004), 11#2 pp 209–219,
 
 
 Karau, Mark D. Germany's Defeat in the First World War: The Lost Battles and Reckless Gambles That Brought Down the Second Reich (ABC-CLIO, 2015) scholarly analysis. excerpt
 
 Watson, Alexander. Ring of Steel: Germany and Austria-Hungary at War, 1914-1918 (2014), excerpt

German army 
 
 
 
 
 
 
 
 Thomas, Nigel. The German Army in World War I (3 vol 2003) Excerpt and text search
 Watson, Alexander. Enduring the Great War: Combat, morale and collapse in the German and British armies, 1914–1918 (Cambridge UP, 2008)

Austria-Hungary

 Deak, John. "The Great War and the Forgotten Realm: The Habsburg Monarchy and the First World War," Journal of Modern History 86#2 (2014): 336–80. online, historiography
 
 
 Jung, Peter. The Austro-Hungarian Forces in World War I 2 vol 2003) Excerpt
 
 Schindler, J. "Steamrollered in Galicia: The Austro-Hungarian Army and the Brusilov Offensive, 1916." War in History 10#1 (2003) pp 27–59 doi=10.1191/0968344503wh260oa
 Sked, Alan. "Austria-Hungary and the First World War." Histoire Politique 1 (2014): 16–49. online historiography
 Tunstall, Graydon A. Austro-Hungarian Army and the First World War (Cambridge UP 2021) online review
 Watson, Alexander. Ring of Steel: Germany and Austria-Hungary at War, 1914-1918 (2014), excerpt
 Wawro, Geoffrey A Mad Catastrophe: The Outbreak of World War I and the Collapse of the Habsburg Empire (Hachette, 2014).
 Zametica, John. Folly and malice: the Habsburg empire, the Balkans and the start of World War One (London: Shepheard–Walwyn, 2017). 416pp.

Ottoman Empire
 Akın, Yiğit. When the War Came Home: The Ottomans' Great War and the Devastation of an Empire. (Stanford UP, 2018).
 
 
 Bozarslan, Hamit. "The Ottoman Empire." in John Horne. ed. A Companion to World War I (2010): 494–507.
 Gingeras, Ryan. Fall of the Sultanate: The Great War and the End of the Ottoman Empire, 1908-1922 (Oxford UP, 2016).
 
 Macfie, A. L. The End of the Ottoman Empire, 1908-1923 (1998).
 Penix, Matthew David. "The Ottoman Empire in the first world war: A rational disaster" ( MA thesis Eastern Michigan U. 2013)). online, bibliography pp 58–66
 Reynolds, Michael. Shattering Empires: the Clash and Collapse of the Ottoman and Russian Empires, 1908-1918 (Cambridge UP, 2011).

Neutrals
 Abbenhuis, Maartje M. The art of staying neutral: the Netherlands in the First World War, 1914-1918 (Amsterdam University Press, 2006).
 Coogan, John W. The End of Neutrality: The United States, Britain, and Maritime Rights, 1899-1915. (Cornell University Press, 1981).
 Den Hertog, Johan, and Samuël Kruizinga, eds. Caught in the middle: neutrals, neutrality, and the First World War (Amsterdam University Press, 2011).
 
 Jonas, Frank. Scandinavia and the Great Powers in the First World War (2019) online review
 Koblik, Steven. Neutral Europe between war and revolution, 1917-23 (University of Virginia Press, 1988).
 Rausch, Jane M. Colombia and World War I: The Experience of a Neutral Latin American Nation during the Great War and Its Aftermath, 1914–1921 (Lexington Books, 2014).
 Syrett, Harold C. "The Business Press and American Neutrality, 1914-1917." Mississippi Valley Historical Review 32.2 (1945): 215-230 online.
 
 Tucker, Robert W. Woodrow Wilson and the Great War: reconsidering America's neutrality, 1914-1917 (U of Virginia Press, 2007).

Homefronts

 Akın, Yiğit. When the War Came Home: The Ottomans' Great War and the Devastation of an Empire (Stanford University Press, 2018)
 Darrow, Margaret H., French Women and the First World War (Berg, 2000) 
 Gearóid Barry, Enrico Dal Lago, Róisín Healy. Small Nations and Colonial Peripheries in World War I (Brill, 2016) online review
 Grayzel, Susan, Women and the First World War (2002), worldwide coverage
 Healy, Maureen, Vienna and the Fall of the Habsburg Empire: Total War and Everyday Life in World War I (2004)
 Higham, Robin and Dennis E. Showalter, eds., Researching World War I: A Handbook (2003), 475pp; highly detailed historiography, stressing military themes; annotates over 1000 books—mostly military but many on the homefront; online edition 
 Horne, John N., ed. A Companion to World War I (2010), 38 essays by leading scholars covering all facets of the war excerpt and text search  
 Horne, John N., State, Society and Mobilization in Europe during the First World War (1997, reissued in 2002)  
 Kennedy, David M.,Over Here: The First World War and American Society (1980, reissued in 2004) 
 Licursi, Kimberly J. Lamay. Remembering World War I in America (2018)
 Lutz, Ralph Haswell, ed. Fall of the German Empire, 1914–1918 (2 vol 1932). 868pp online review, primary sources
 Proctor, Tammy M., Civilians in a World at War, 1914-1918 (2010) 410pp; global coverage excerpt and text search 
 
 Stevenson, David, Cataclysm: The First World War as Political Tragedy (2005) 625pp; excerpt and text search 
 Stevenson, David, With Our Backs to the Wall: Victory and Defeat in 1918 (2011) excerpt and text search covers both the homefront and the battlefields for the major powers 
 Strachan, Hew, The First World War (vol 1, 2005) 1225pp; covers the battlefields and chief home fronts in 1914-1917 excerpt and text search 
 
 Swift, David. For Class and Country: the Patriotic Left and the First World War (2017)
 Tucker, Spencer, ed. European Powers in the First World War: An Encyclopedia (1999) excerpt and text search 
 Tucker, Spencer, ed. The Encyclopedia of World War I: A Political, Social, and Military History (5 vol 2005); the most detailed reference source; articles by specialists cover all aspects of the war 
 Tucker, Spencer C., ed. World War I: A Student Encyclopedia. 4 vol. ABC-CLIO, 2006. 2454 pp.
 Wilson, Trevor,  The Myriad Faces of War: Britain and the Great War 1914-1918 (1989) excerpt and text search
 Winter, J. M., The Experience of World War I (2006) excerpt and text search
 Winter, Jay, and Jean-Louis Robert, eds. Capital Cities at War: Paris, London, Berlin 1914-1919 (2 vol. 1999, 2007), 30 chapters 1200pp; comprehensive coverage by scholars vol 1 excerpt; vol 2 excerpt and text search

Economics

 Bogart, E.L. Direct and Indirect Costs of the Great World War (2nd ed. 1920); comprehensive coverage of every major country; online free
 Broadberry, Stephen, and Mark Harrison, eds. The Economics of World War I (2005) . Covers France, Britain, USA, Russia, Italy, Germany, Austria-Hungary, the Ottoman Empire, and the Netherlands, 362pp; excerpt and text search
 Ferguson, Niall The Pity of War (1999), cultural and economic themes
 Fisk, Harvey E., The Inter-Ally Debts: An Analysis of War and Post-War Public Finance, 1914-1923 (1924) online
 Grayzel, Susan, Women and the First World War (2002), worldwide coverage
 Hardach, Gerd, The First World War 1914-1918 (1977), economic history of major powers
 Horn, Martin. Britain, France, and the Financing of the First World War (2002)
 Howard, N. P. "The Social and Political Consequences of the Allied Food Blockade of Germany, 1918-19," German History, April 1993, Vol. 11 Issue 2, pp 161–188
 Menderhausen, Horst, The Economics of War (1940) online
 Osborne, Eric, Britain's Economic Blockade of Germany, 1914-1919 (2004)
 Stevenson, David, With Our Backs to the Wall: Victory and Defeat in 1918 (2011) excerpt and text search, pp 350–438, covers major countries
 Strachan, Hew, Financing the First World War (2004) , a full study of how the War was paid for
 Stubbs, Kevin D., Race to the Front: The Materiel Foundations of Coalition Strategy in the Great War (2002) 
 Shotwell, James T., Economic and Social History of the World War (1924)
 Thorp, William Long, Business Annals: United States, England, France, Germany, Austria, Russia, Sweden Netherlands, Italy, Argentina, Brazil, Canada, South Africa, Australia, India, Japan, China (1926) capsule summary of conditions in each country for each quarter-year 1790-1925
 Winter, J. M. The Experience of World War I (2nd ed 2005)

Battles and Campaigns

Western Front
 
 
  despite the title covers entire war
  general military history
 Gilbert, Martin. The Somme: Heroism and Horror in the First World War (2007) excerpt and text search
 Harris, J. P. Douglas Haig and the First World War (2009) excerpt and text search
 Herwig, Holger H. Operation Michael: The "Last Card" 2001 German Spring Offensive in 1918
 
 Lengel, Edward G. To Conquer Hell: The Meuse-Argonne, 1918 The Epic Battle That Ended the First World War (2009) excerpt and text search
 
 
 
 
 Tuchman, Barbara. The Guns of August, tells of the opening diplomatic and military manoeuvres.
 
 Wolff, Leon. In Flanders Fields: The 1917 Campaign (1958)

Eastern Front
 
 
 
 
 Tunstall, Graydon A. Austro-Hungarian Army and the First World War (Cambridge UP 2021) online review

Specialty military topics

Infantry and artillery
 Ashworth, Tony. Trench Warfare, 1914-1918: the live and let live system (Pan Macmillan, 2000)
 Bidwell, Shelford and Graham, Dominick. Firepower: British Army Weapons and Theories of War, 1904-1945 (1992)
 Engen, Rob. "Steel Against Fire: The Bayonet in the First World War." Journal of Military and Strategic Studies (2006) 8#3 Online
 
 Gudmundsson, Bruce I. Stormtroop Tactics: Innovation in the German Army, 1914-1918 (1989)
 Love, Albert G. War Casualties (1931) online statistics and how compiled for U.S. Army
 Lewis-Stempel, John. "Six Weeks: The Short and Gallant Life of the British Officer in the First World War" (2010)
 Messenger, Charles. Call To Arms: The British Army 1914-1918 (2005), recruitment, training, supplying of officers & men
 Sheffield, G. D. Leadership in the Trenches: Officer-Man Relations, Morale and Discipline in the British Army in the Era of the First World War (2000)
 Smith, Leonard V. Between Mutiny and Obedience. The Case of the French Fifth Infantry Division during World War I (1994)
 
 Weber, Thomas. Hitler's First War: Adolf Hitler, the Men of the List Regiment, and the First World War (2010)

Logistics
 van Creveld, Martin. "World War I and the revolution in logistics." in y Roger Chickering and Stig Förster, eds. Great War, total war: combat and mobilization on the Western Front 1918 (2006): 57–72.
 
 Lloyd-Jones, Roger, and Myrddin John Lewis. Arming the Western Front: War, Business and the State in Britain 1900–1920 (Routledge, 2016).
 Pratt, Edwin A. The rise of rail-power in war and conquest, 1833-1914 (1915) online
 
 Tynan, Jane. British Army Uniform and the First World War (Palgrave Macmillan, 2013).

Intelligence, espionage
 Andrew, Christopher. For the President's Eyes Only: Secret Intelligence and the American Presidency from Washington to Bush (1996) pp 30–70.
 Barton, George. Celebrated Spies and Famous Mysteries of the Great War (1929) online
 Beesly, Patrick. Room 40 London: Hamish Hamilton, 1982. Covers the breaking of German codes by RN intelligence, Zimmermann telegram, and confusion at Jutland
 Boghardt, Thomas. Spies of the Kaiser: German Covert Operations in Great Britain during the First World War Era (2004).
 Boghardt, Thomas. The Zimmermann telegram: intelligence, diplomacy, and America's entry into World War I (2012).
 Dockrill, Michael. and David French, eds. Strategy and Intelligence: British Policy During the First World War (1996).
 Debruyne, Emmanuel. "Espionage" In: Ute Daniel, et al. eds. 1914-1918-online: International Encyclopedia of the First World War online 22 page scholarly history full text
 Finnegan, Terrance. "The Origins of Modern Intelligence, Surveillance, and Reconnaissance: Military Intelligence at the Front, 1914–18," Studies in Intelligence 53#4 (2009) pp. 25–40.
 Foley, Robert T. "Easy Target or Invincible Enemy? German Intelligence Assessments of France Before the Great War." Journal of Intelligence History 5#2 (2005): 1-24.
 Khan, David. The Codebreakers (1996). Covers the breaking of Russian codes
 Kahn, David. "Codebreaking in World Wars I and II: The Major Successes and Failures, Their Causes and Their Effects", Historical Journal 23#3 (1980) pp. 617–39.
 Khan, David. The Reader of Gentlemen's Mail: Herbert O. Yardley and the Birth of American Codebreaking (2004)
 Larsen, Daniel. "Intelligence in the First World War: The state of the field." Intelligence and National Security 29.2 (2014): 282–302, comprehensive overview
 Larsen, Daniel. "British codebreaking and American diplomatic telegrams, 1914–1915." Intelligence and National Security 32.2 (2017): 256–263. The British read the American secrets from late 1915 online
 May, Ernest R. ed. Knowing One's Enemy: Intelligence Assessment Before the two World Wars (1984)
 Parr, Edward. "Kingdoms Fall: The Laxenburg Message" (2013). Fact-based fictional account of Secret Intelligence Service agents during World War I, including Suvla Bay landing, Salonika landing, Battle of Verdun. First of a trilogy.
 
 Porch, Douglas. The French Secret Services: A History of French Intelligence from the Dreyfus Affair to the Gulf War (2003). excerpt; also online review, pp 49–114.
 Seligmann, Matthew (2006). Spies in Uniform: British Military and Naval Intelligence on the Eve of the First World War. Oxford: Oxford University Press. 
 Trumpener, Ulrich. "War Premeditated? German Intelligence Operations in July 1914," Central European History 9#1 (1976): 58-85
 Tuchman, Barbara W. The Zimmermann Telegram (1966)
 Witcover, Jules. Sabotage at Black Tom: Imperial Germany's Secret War in America, 1914-1917 (1989)

Medicine
 
 Carden-Coyne, Ana. The Politics of Wounds: Military Patients and Medical Power in the First World War (Oxford University Press, 2014), from the patients' perspective
 Grant, Susan-Mary. "On the Field of Mercy: Women Medical Volunteers from the Civil War to the First World War." American Nineteenth Century History (2012) 13#2 pp: 276–278. on USA
 Haller, Jr., John S. "Treatment of infected wounds during the Great War, 1914 to 1918." Southern medical journal (1992) 85#3 pp: 303–315.
 Harrison, Mark. The medical war: British military medicine in the First World War (Oxford University Press, 2010)
 Jones, Edgar, and Simon Wessely. Shell shock to PTSD: Military psychiatry from 1900 to the Gulf War (Psychology Press, 2005)
 Jones, Edgar. "Terror weapons: the British experience of gas and its treatment in the first world war." War in History (2014) 21#3 pp: 355–375.
 
 
 Loughran, Tracey. "Shell shock, trauma, and the First World War: the making of a diagnosis and its histories." Journal of the History of Medicine and Allied Sciences (2012) 67#1 pp: 94–119.
 Mitchell, Thomas John, and G. M. Smith. Medical services, casualties and medical statistics of the great war (London: HM Stationery Office, 1931)
 
 Rees, Peter. The Other ANZACs (2008)
 Yanıkdağ, Yücel. Healing the Nation: Prisoners of War, Medicine and Nationalism in Turkey, 1914–1939 (2013)

Weapons

Air War
 Angelucci, Enzo, Matricardi, Paolo. World Aircraft: Origins-World War I (1979). .
 Bennett, Leon. Three Wings for the Red Baron: Von Richthofen, Strategy, Tactics, and Airplanes (2001). . 248 pgs.
 Bickers, Richard Townshend. The First Great Air War (1989). . 277 pgs.
 Boelcke, Oswald, An Aviators Field Book,1914-1916 (1991)  pgs.
 Chajkowsky, William E., Royal Flying Corps, Bordon to Texas to Beamsville (1979) Boston Mills Press, .
 Bowyer, Chaz. Royal Flying Corps Communiques: 1917-1918 (1998). . 258 pgs.
 Chickering, Roger, et al. eds. Great War, Total War : Combat and Mobilization on the Western Front, 1914-1918 (Publications of the German Historical Institute) (2000). . 584 pgs.
 Clark, Alan. Aces high: The war in the air over the Western Front 1914-18 (1973). . 191 pgs.
 Cooke, James J.. The U.S. Air Service In the Great War: 1917-1919 (1996). . 272 pgs.
 Cormack, Andrew, Peter Cormack. British Air Forces (1) : 1914-1918 (Men-At-Arms Series, 341) (2000). Osprey Publishing (UK). . 48 pgs.
 Cowin, Hugh W. Allied Aviation of World War I: A Pictorial History of Allied Aviators and Aircraft of the Great War (2000). Osprey Aviation. . 112 pgs.
 Cowin, Hugh W. German and Austrian Aviation of World War I: A Pictorial Chronicle of the Airmen and Aircraft That Forged German Airpower (2000). Osprey Pub Co. . 96 pgs.
 
 Cuneo, John R. Winged Mars (2 Volumes) (1942). The Military Service Publishing Company. 338 pgs. 
 Diggens, Barry. September Evening: The Life and Final Combat of the German World War One Ace Werner Voss (2003). Grub Street. . 192 pgs.
 Dodds, Ronald. The Brave Young Wings (1980). Canada's Wings, Inc., Stittsville, Ontario, Canada. . 302 pgs.
 Editors, Time Life, Ezra Bowen. Knights of the Air (Epic of Flight) (1980). Warner Books Inc. . 192 pgs.
 Frandsen, Bert. Hat in the Ring: The Birth of American Air Power in the Great War (2003). Smithsonian Books. . 320 pgs.
 Franks, Norman L. R., Frank W. Bailey, and Russell Guest. Above the Lines: The Aces and Fighter Units of the German Air Service, Naval Air Service and Flanders Marine Corps 1914-1918 (1994). Grub Street . 259 pgs.
 Franks, Norman L. R., Guest, Russell, and Alegi, Gregory. Above the War Fronts: The British Two-Seater Bomber Pilot and Observer Aces, the British Two-Seater Fighter Observer Aces, and the Belgian, Italian, Austro-Hungarian and Russian Fighter Aces 1914-1918 (1997). Grub Street. 218 pgs.
 Franks, Norman L.R., Bailey, Frank W. Over the Front: A Complete Record of the Fighter Aces and Units of the United States and French Air Services, 1914-1918 (1992). Casemate Pub
 Franks, Norman L.R., Guest, Russell, Bailey, Frank W. Bloody April...Black September (1995). Grub Street. 314 pgs.
 Franks, Norman, Bailey, Frank, Bailey, Frank W. The Storks: The Story of the Les Cigognes, France's Elite Fighter Group of Wwi (1998). Grub Street. 160 pgs.
 Franks, Norman, Giblin, Hal. Under the Guns of the Kaiser's Aces: Bohme, Muller, Von Tutschek, Wolff : The Complete Record of Their Victories and Victims (2003). Grub Street. 192 pgs.
 Franks, Norman, Wyngarden, Greg Van, Holmes, Tony. Fokker Dr I Aces of World War I (Osprey Aircraft of the Aces No 40) (2001). Osprey Aviation. 96 pgs.
 Franks, Norman. Jasta Boelcke: The History of Jasta 2, 1916-1918 (2004). Grub Street. 224 pgs.
 Franks, Norman. Sopwith Camel Aces of World War 1 (Aircraft of the Aces, 52) (2003). Osprey Publishing (UK). 96 pgs.
 Gibbons, Floyd. Red Knight of Germany: The Story of Baron Von Richthofen, Germany's Great War Bird (1927, 1979). Arno Press. 383 pgs.
 Grinnel-Milne, Duncan. Wind in the Wires (1968) Doubleday Publishing (ISBN Not given). 259 pages with illus.
 Grosz, Peter, Haddow, George, Schiemer, Peter. Austro-Hungarian Army Aircraft of World War I (2002). Flying Machines Press. 544 pgs.
 Guttman, Jon, Holmes, Tony. SPA124 Lafayette Escadrille: American Volunteer Airmen in World War 1 (Aviation Elite Units, 17) (2004). Osprey Publishing (UK). 128 pgs.
 Guttman, Jon. Spad VII Aces of World War I (Osprey Aircraft of the Aces No 39) (2001). Osprey Aviation. 96 pgs.
 Hepplewhite, Peter. World War I: In The Air (2003). Pan Macmillan. 144 pgs.
 Herris, Jack. Pfalz Aircraft of World War I (Great War Aircraft in Profile, Volume 4) (2001). Flying Machines Press. 184 pgs.
 Holley, I. B. Ideas and Weapons: Exploitation of the Aerial Weapon by the United States During World War I(1983)
 Hudson, James J. Hostile Skies (1997). Syracuse University Press. 338 pgs.
 Hurley, Alfred F. Billy Mitchell, Crusader for Air Power (1975)
 Immelmann, Franz. Immelmann,The Eagle Of Lille (1990) . 240 pgs.
 Jeffers, H. Paul. Ace of Aces: The Life of Captain Eddie Rickenbacker (2003). Presidio Press. 352 pgs.
 Johnson, Herbert A. Wingless Eagle: U.S. Army Aviation Through World War I (2001). University of North Carolina Press. 298 pgs.
 Kennett, Lee. First Air War, 1914-1918 (1999). Free Press. 288 pgs.
 Lewis, Cecil. "Sagittarius Rising", 1936 Greenhill Books, 332 pages, 
 Lawson, Eric and Jane Lawson. The First Air Campaign, August 1914-November 1918 (1996)
 Leaman, Paul. Fokker Dr.I Triplane: A World War One Legend (2003). Classic Publications. 224 pgs.
 McKee, Alexander. The Friendless Sky (1984). Academy Chicago Publishers. 256 pgs.
 Morrow, John. German Air Power in World War I. Lincoln: University of Nebraska Press, 1982. Contains design and production figures, as well as economic influences.
 Morrow, John H., Jr. The Great War in the Air (1993). Smithsonian Books. 464 pgs.
 O'Connor, Martin. Air Aces of the Austro-Hungarian Empire, 1914-1918 (1986). Flying Machines Press. 338 pgs.
 O'Connor, Mike. Airfields & Airmen: Cambrai (Battleground Europe) (2003). Pen & Sword Books. 176 pgs.
 Outlet, Bernard Fitzsimons (Editor) /. Warplanes & Air Battles Of World War I (1973, 1988). Beekman House / Crescent. 160 pgs.
 Owers, Colin. De Havilland Aircraft of World War I: Volume 1, D.H.1-D.H.4 (Great War Aircraft in Profile, Volume 5) (2001). Flying Machines Press. 88 pgs.
 Revell, Alex. Victoria Cross WW I: WWI Airmen and Their Aircraft (1997). Flying Machines Press. 96 pgs.
 Richthofen, Manfred Von, Franks, Norman. The Red Air Fighter (1999). Stackpole Books. 192 pgs.
 Rickenbacker, Eddie V. Fighting the Flying Circus: The Greatest True Air Adventure to Come Out of World War I (2001). Doubleday Books. 324 pgs.
 Shores, Christopher, Rolfe, Mark. British and Empire Aces of World War I (Osprey Aircraft of the Aces No 45) (2001). Osprey Publishing (UK). 96 pgs.
 Simkins, Peter. Air Fighting 1914-1918 (The Struggle for Air Superiority over the Western Front) (1978). Imperial War Museum. 80 pgs.
 Smith, Adrian. Mick Mannock, Fighter Pilot: Myth, Life and Politics (Studies in Military and Strategic History) (2001). Palgrave MacMillan. 211 pgs.
 Staff, Vigilant, Sykes, Claud W., Franks, Norman. German War Birds (1994). Greenhill Books. 288 pgs.
 Treadwell, Terry C. America's First Air War (2000). MBI Publishing. 176 pgs.
 Vanwyngarden, Greg. Richthofen's Flying Circus: Jagdgeschwader Nr 1 (Aviation Elite Units, 16) (2004). Osprey Publishing (UK). 128 pgs.
 Winter, Denis. First of the Few. London: Allen Lane/Penguin, 1982. Coverage of the British air war, with extensive bibliographical notes.
 Wise, S.F., Canadian Airmen and the First World War: The Official History of the Royal Canadian Air Force, Vol. 1, (1980). University of Toronto Press, .
 Wood, Alan C. Aces and Airmen of Ww1 (2002). Brassey's Inc. . 176 pgs.

Gas
 Haber, L. F. The Poisonous Cloud: Chemical Warfare in the First World War (1986);
 Palazzo, Albert. Seeking Victory on the Western Front: The British Army and Chemical Warfare in World War I (2000)
 Richter, Donald. Chemical Soldiers: British Gas Warfare in World War I (1992)
 Freemantle, Michael. Gas! Gas! Quick, Boys!: How Chemistry Changed the First World War (2012)

Naval war
 Allard, Dean C. "Anglo-American Naval Differences During World War I." Military Affairs: Journal of Military History (1980): 75–81. in JSTOR
 Bennett, Geoffrey. Naval Battles of the First World War (Pen and Sword, 2014)
 Coogan, John W. The End of Neutrality: The United States, Britain and Maritime Rights, 1899-1915 (Cornell University Press, 1981)
 Farquharson-Roberts, Mike. A History of the Royal Navy: World War I (IB Tauris, 2014)
 Goldrick, James. The Kingś Ships Were at Sea: The War in the North Sea, August 1914-February 1915 (US Naval Institute Press, 1984)
 Grimes, Shawn T. Strategy and War Planning in the British Navy, 1887-1918 (Boydell Press, 2012)
 Halpern, Paul G. The War at Sea (Wiley‐Blackwell, 1998)
 Halpern, Paul G. The Mediterranean naval situation, 1908-1914 (Harvard UP, 1971)
 Holloway, S. M. From Trench and Turret: Royal Marines' Letters and Diaries 1914-18 (Constable, 2006), primary sources
 Hough, Richard. The Great War at Sea, 1914-1918 (Oxford UP, 1987)
 Kirschbaum, Joseph W. The 1916 Naval Expansion Act: Planning for a Navy Second to None (ProQuest, 2008). US Navy
 London, Charles. Jutland 1916: clash of the dreadnoughts (Osprey, 2000)
 MacGregor, David. "The Use, Misuse, and Non-Use of History: The Royal Navy and the Operational Lessons of the First World War." Journal of Military History (1992): 603–616. in JSTOR
 Marder, Arthur Jacob. From the Dreadnought to Scapa Flow (4 vol. 1961–70), covers Royal Navy 1904-1919
  online review
 Osborne, Eric W. Britain's economic blockade of Germany, 1914-1919 (Routledge, 2004)
 Peebles, Hugh B. Warshipbuilding on the Clyde: Naval orders and the prosperity of the Clyde shipbuilding industry, 1889-1939 (John Donald, 1987)
 Sondhaus, Lawrence. The Great War at Sea: A Naval History of the First World War (Cambridge University Press, 2014) 417 pp. Online review and summary
 Trask, David F. Captains & cabinets: Anglo-American naval relations, 1917-1918 (University of Missouri Press, 1972)
 Woodward, Ernest Llewellyn. Great Britain and the German navy (1935)
 The Royal Navy in the First World War

Naval aviation
 Benbow, Tim, ed. British naval aviation: the first 100 years (Ashgate, 2013)
 Ingalls, David S. Hero of the Angry Sky: The World War I Diary and Letters of David S. Ingalls, America's First Naval Ace (Ohio University Press, 2013)
 Layman, R. D. Naval Aviation in the First World War: Its Impact and Influence (Naval Institute Press, 1996)
 Till, Geoffrey. Air Power and the Royal Navy, 1914-1945: a historical survey (Macdonald and Jane's, 1979)

Submarines
 Abbatiello, John. Anti-Submarine Warfare in World War I: British Naval Aviation and the Defeat of the U-Boats (2005)
 Compton-Hall, Richard. Submarines and the War at Sea, 1914-18 (Macmillan, 1991)
 Gray, Edwyn A. The U-Boat War, 1914-1918 (1994)
 Greentree, David, Ian Palmer, and Peter Dennis. Q Ship Vs U-Boat: 1914-18 (Osprey, 2014)
 Hackmann, Willem Dirk. Seek & Strike: Sonar, anti-submarine warfare and the Royal Navy 1914-54 (Unipub, 1984)
 Henry, Chris. Depth Charge!: Mines, Depth Charges and Underwater Weapons, 1914-1945 (Casemate Publishers, 2005)
 van der Vat, Dan. The Atlantic Campaign. (1988). Connects submarine and antisubmarine operations between wars, and suggests a continuous war.
 Price, Alfred, Dr. Aircraft versus the Submarine. Deals with technical developments, including the first dipping hydrophones.
 Thomas, Lowell. Raiders Of The Deep (1928, 2004)

Tanks
 Elson, Aaron. The Armored Fist: The 712th Tank Battalion in the Second World War (Fonthill Media, 2014) 
 Foley, Michael. Rise of the Tank: Armoured Vehicles and their use in the First World War (Pen and Sword, 2014) 
 Fuller, J.F.C. Tanks in the Great War (1920)
 Guderian, Heinz. Achtung! Panzer (1937)
 Hammond, Christopher Brynley. The Theory and Practice of British Tank Warfare on the Western Front During the First World War (Ashgate, 2013) 
 
 Wilson, Dale E. Treat 'Em Rough!: The Birth of American Armor, 1917-20 (1989)

Popular histories and documentaries
 Taylor, A. J. P. The First World War: An Illustrated History, Hamish Hamilton, 1963
 Editors of American Heritage. History of WWI. Simon & Schuster, 1964. popular
 Strachan, Hew ed. The Oxford Illustrated History of the First World War, a collection of chapters from various scholars
 Toland, John. No Man's Land. 1918 - The Last Year of the Great War (1980)
 The Great War, television documentary by the BBC.
 The Great War, documentary film which aired on PBS as part of the series American Experience

Cultural, literary, artistic, memorials
 Cruickshank, John, Variations on Catastrophe: Some French Responses to the Great War (1982) 
 Eksteins, Modris, Rites of Spring: The Great War and the Birth of the Modern Age (1989, reissued in 2000). 
 , classic study of WWI literature
 Bairnsfather, Bruce, Bullets & Billets (1916) . Cartoons.
 Genno, C.N. and H. Wetzel, eds. The First World War in German Narrative Prose (1980).
 Hynes, Samuel, A War Imagined: The First World War in English Culture (1987) 
 
 James, Pearl, The New Death: American Modernism and World War I (University of Virginia Press; 2013) ; 272 pages; responses to war by Willa Cather, William Faulkner, F. Scott Fitzgerald, and Ernest Hemingway.
 Mosse, George L. Fallen Soldiers: Reshaping the Memory of the World Wars (1991) 
 Parfitt, George, Fiction of the First World War: A Study (London: Faber 1990) 
 Raitt, Suzanne and Trudi Tateeds, Women's Fiction and the Great War (Clarendon Press, 1997) 
 Robb, George. British Culture And The First World War (2002) 
 Roshwald, Aviel Roshwald . European Culture in the Great War : The Arts, Entertainment and Propaganda, 1914-1918 (2002) 
 
 Sherry, Vincent, The Cambridge Companion to the Literature of the First World War (2005) 
 Stallworthy, Jon, Great Poets of World War I: Poetry from the Great War (2002) 
 Vance, Jonathan F. Death So Noble: Memory, Meaning, and the First World War (1997) 
 Verhey, Jeffrey, The Spirit of 1914: Militarism, Myth and Mobilization in Germany (2000) 
 Viney, Nigel, Images of Wartime: British Art and Artists of World War I (1991) 
 Watson, Janet S. K., Fighting Different Wars: Experience, Memory, and the First World War in Britain (2004) 
 Winter, Jay, Sites of Memory, Sites of Mourning: The Great War in European Cultural History (1995, reissued in 1998)

Propaganda and media
 Adams M.C.C. The Great Adventure: Male desire and the coming of World War I (1990).,
 Bruntz. Allied Propaganda and the collapse of the German Empire in 1918 (1938)
 Buitenhuis, P. The Great war of Words: Literature as Propaganda, 1914-18 and After (1989)
 
 Chambers, John Whiteclay. "'All Quiet on the Western Front' (1930): the antiwar film and the image of the First World War." Historical journal of film, radio and television 14.4 (1994): 377–411.
 Cole, Robert, ed. The Encyclopedia of Propaganda (3 vols. Sharpe Reference, 1998)
 Cornwall, Mark. "News, Rumour and the Control of Information in Austria‐Hungary, 1914–1918." History 77#249 (1992): 50–64.
 Cornwall, Mark. The undermining of Austria-Hungary: the battle for hearts and minds (2000)
 Collins, Ross F. Children, War and Propaganda (Peter Lang, 2011)
  Analysis by the head of American propaganda in the First World War
 Demm, Eberhard. Censorship and Propaganda in World War I: A Comprehensive History (Bloomsbury Academic, 2019) online review
 German, Kathleen. Promises of Citizenship: Film Recruitment of African Americans in World War II (Univ. Press of Mississippi, 2017).
 
 Gullace, Nicoletta F. "Allied Propaganda and World War I: Interwar Legacies, Media Studies, and the Politics of War Guilt." History Compass (2011) 9#9 pp: 686–700.
 Haste, Cate. Keep the home fires burning: Propaganda in the First World War (Lane, Allen, 1977), On Britain
 Isenberg, Michael T. War on Film: The American Cinema and World War I, 1914-1941 (1981).
 
 Johnson, Niel M. George Sylvester Viereck, German-American Propagandist (University of Illinois Press, 1972), in World War I
 Kingsbury, Celia Malone. For Home and Country: World War I Propaganda on the Home Front (University of Nebraska Press; 2010; 308 pages). Describes propaganda directed toward the homes of the American homefront in everything from cookbooks and popular magazines to children's toys.
 Lasswell, Harold D. Propaganda Technique in the World War. (1927), A famous classic
 
 
 Monger, David. Patriotism and Propaganda in First World War Britain: The National War Aims Committee and Civilian Morale (2013) online edition
 Paddock, Troy. A Call to Arms: Propaganda, Public Opinion, and Newspapers in the Great War (2004)
 Peterson, Horace Cornelius. Propaganda for war: The campaign against American neutrality, 1914-1917 (University of Oklahoma Press, 1939), on the operations of private organizations.
 Ponsonby, Arthur. Falsehood in War-Time; Containing an Assortment of Lies circulated throughout the Nations during the Great War (London, UK: Allen & Unwin, 1928)
 Roshwald, Aviel Roshwald . European Culture in the Great War : The Arts, Entertainment and Propaganda, 1914-1918 (2002)
 Sanders, Michael, and Philip M. Taylor. British Propaganda During the First World War, 1914-18 (Macmillan, 1982)
 Scott, Jonathan French. Five Weeks: The Surge of Public Opinion on the Eve of the Great War (1927) online
 Squires, James Duane. British Propaganda at Home and in the United States from 1914 to 1917 (Harvard University Press, 1935)
 Thompson, J. Lee. Politicians, the Press, & Propaganda: Lord Northcliffe & the Great War, 1914-1919 (Kent State University Press, 1999)
 Welch, David. Germany and Propaganda in World War I: Pacifism, Mobilization and Total War (2014)
 Wood, Richard, and David Culbert, Film and Propaganda in America: A Documentary History: World War I - Vol. 1 (1990)

Posters
 Christopher, John, ed. British Posters of the First World War (2016)
 Darracott, Joseph, and Belinda Loftus, eds. The First World War Posters (1974)
 Dover. Posters of World Wars I and II CD-ROM and Book (2005) 120 American posters from WWI; 
 Rawls, Walton and Maurice Rickards, eds. Wake Up, America. World War I and the American Poster (2001) many color posters
 Rickards, Maurice ed. Posters of the First World War (1968)
 Stanley, Peter, ed. What Did You Do in the War, Daddy? A visual history of propaganda posters (1984)
 White, Edward J. ed. World War I Posters: 100th Anniversary Collectors Edition (2014)

Poetry and songs
 George Walter, The Penguin Book of First World War Poetry (2006)
 On Receiving News of the War, (1914) poem by Isaac Rosenberg
 In Flanders Fields, (1915) poem by John McCrae 
 Anthem for Doomed Youth, (1917) poem by Wilfred Owen
 Dulce et Decorum Est,(1917) poem by Wilfred Owen
 Disabled,(1917) poem by Wilfred Owen
 Base details,(1918) poem by Siegfried Sassoon
 They, (1918) poem by Siegfried Sassoon
 And the Band Played Waltzing Matilda, (1972) song by Eric Bogle
 Over There, (1917) theme song of the war by George M. Cohan

Books and novels
 Le Feu (Under Fire) (1916), novel by Henri Barbusse
 Mr. Britling Sees It Through (1916), novel by H.G. Wells
 The Worn Doorstep (1916), novel by Margaret Sherwood
 Told in a French Garden, August 1914 (1916), novel by Mildred Aldrich
 The Marne (1918), novel by Edith Wharton
 Home Fires in France (1918), fictional sketches by Dorothy Canfield
 The Return of the Soldier (1918), novel by Rebecca West
 Rilla of Ingleside (1920), novel by L.M. Montgomery, an account of the war as experienced by Canadian women of the time
 Storm of Steel, autobiography of Ernst Jünger. First published 1920 and revised several times through 1961
 A World to Mend (1920), novel by Margaret Sherwood
 Three Soldiers (1921), novel by John Dos Passos
 The Enormous Room (1922), novel by E.E. Cummings
 Pădurea Spânzuraţilor/Forest of the Hanged (1922), a novel by Romanian writer Liviu Rebreanu about the drama of the Romanian ethnics from Transylvania who were forced to fight against Romania. The author's brother, Emil Rebreanu, was hanged in 1917 by the Austro-Hungarian army for desertion.
 One of Ours (1922), novel by Willa Cather
 Seven Pillars of Wisdom (1922) by T. E. Lawrence
 The Good Soldier Švejk (1923), satirical novel by Jaroslav Hašek
 A Son at the Front (1923), novel by Edith Wharton
 Parade's End (1924-1928), four-part novel (Some Do Not ..., No More Parades, A Man Could Stand Up, The Last Post) by Ford Madox Ford
 Private 12768: Memoir of a Tommy (1926, first published 2005), memoir by John Jackson, 
 A Farewell to Arms (1929), novel by Ernest Hemingway
 All Quiet on the Western Front (1929), novel written by Erich Maria Remarque
 Death of a Hero (1929), novel by Richard Aldington
 Goodbye to All That (1929), autobiography of Robert Graves
 The Middle Parts of Fortune (1929, 1977), a novel by Frederic Manning
 A Subaltern's War (1929), a novel by Charles Edmund Carrington
 The Wet Flanders Plain (1929), a novel by Henry Williamson
 Her Privates We (1930, 1999), a novel by Frederic Manning
 Generals Die in Bed (1930), novel by Charles Yale Harrison
 Memoirs of an Infantry Officer (1930), novel by Siegfried Sassoon
 The Patriot's Progress (1930), a novel by Henry Williamson
 Testament of Youth (1933), memoir by Vera Brittain
 Winged Victory (1934), a novel by V. M. Yeates
 God's Sparrows (1937), a novel by Philip Child
 Un anno sull'altipiano (A Year on the Plateau) (1938), novel by Emilio Lussu
 World's End (1940), first novel in Upton Sinclair's Pulitzer Prize winning Lanny Budd series
 Chronicles of Ancient Sunlight (1951-1969), a series of novels by Henry Williamson
 The Bartholomew Bandy novels (1962, 1973–76) (Three Cheers for Me!, That's Me in the Middle and It's Me Again) by Donald Jack.
 The Wars (1977), novel by Timothy Findley
 The Otto Prohaska Novels (1991-1994) (A Sailor of Austria, The Emperor's Coloured Coat, The Two-Headed Eagle and Tomorrow the World), novels by John Biggins
 Regeneration (1991), The Eye in the Door, 1993; The Ghost Road novels by Pat Barker
 Birdsong (1993), novel by Sebastian Faulks
 Deafening (2003), book written by Frances Itani
 No Graves As Yet (2003), first volume of a trilogy of novels by Anne Perry
 A Long, Long Way (2005), novel by Sebastian Barry
 Three Day Road (2005) novel by Joseph Boyden about northern Ontario Cree, in the Canadian Second Division, on the front line.
 To the Last Man (2005), novel by Jeff Shaara
 A Young Man's War (2008), letters from the Front by Alec Ward
 Kingdoms Fall: The Laxenburg Message (2013) , a novel by Edward Parr

Films, plays, television series and mini-series
 The Four Horsemen of the Apocalypse (1921), movie directed by Rex Ingram, based on a novel by Vicente Blasco Ibáñez
 The Big Parade (1925), movie directed by King Vidor, adapted by Harry Behn from the play by Joseph Farnham and the autobiographical novel Plumes by Laurence Stallings.
 Mare Nostrum (1926), movie directed by Rex Ingram, based on a novel by Vicente Blasco Ibáñez
 Wings (1927), directed by William A. Wellman tells the story about two fighter pilots. The film is one of only two silent movie to win the Academy Oscar for Best Picture.
 Journey's End (1928), play written by R. C. Sherriff
 All Quiet on the Western Front (1930), movie directed by Lewis Milestone, based on the novel by Erich Maria Remarque (1929).
 Hell's Angels (1930), movie directed by Howard Hughes.
 War Nurse (1930), movie directed by Edgar Selwyn.
 Westfront 1918 (1930), German-language movie directed by Georg Wilhelm Pabst. Later banned under the Nazi regime.
 Grand Illusion (1937), directed by Jean Renoir
 Sergeant York (1941), movie directed by Howard Hawks
 Yankee Doodle Dandy (1942), directed by Michael Curtiz
 Paths of Glory (1957), movie directed by Stanley Kubrick, based on the novel by Humphrey Cobb (1935)
 Marš na Drinu (1964), Serbian war film about a Serbian artillery battalion in the Battle of Cer
 Lawrence of Arabia (1962), movie covering events surrounding T. E. Lawrence in the pan-Arabian Theatre, starring Peter O'Toole, Alec Guinness, Anthony Quinn, and Omar Sharif and directed by David Lean
 World War I (1964), CBS News documentary narrated by Robert Ryan
 The Great War (1964) TV series by Correlli Barnett and others of BBC
 Doctor Zhivago (1965), movie by David Lean, based on the novel by Boris Pasternak, deals with Russia's involvement in the war and how it led to that country's Revolution.
 The Blue Max (1966), movie directed by John Guillermin, titled after the Prussian military award, or Pour le Mérite
 Oh! What a Lovely War(1969), film directed by Richard Attenborough, based on the stage musical Oh, What a Lovely War! (1963) by Joan Littlewood and Theatre Workshop.
 Many Wars Ago (1970) (Italian title; Uomini Contro), set during the Isonzo campaign, where many tired Italian soldiers begin a mutiny.
 Johnny Got His Gun (1971), movie directed by Dalton Trumbo
 Gallipoli (1981), movie directed by Peter Weir
 Observe the Sons of Ulster Marching Towards the Somme, (1985), play by Frank McGuinness
 The Lighthorsemen (1987), movie directed by Simon Wincer
 Blackadder Goes Forth (1989), TV series by Richard Curtis and Ben Elton
 The Great War and the Shaping of the 20th Century (1996), Emmy-winning miniseries coproduced by KCET & BBC, distributed in the US by PBS
 Regeneration (1997), movie directed by Gillies MacKinnon, based on the novel by Pat Barker (1991)
 The Lost Battalion (2001), movie and screenplay directed by Russell Mulcahy
 A Very Long Engagement (2004), movie directed by Jean-Pierre Jeunet, based on the novel by Sebastien Japrisot (1991)
 Joyeux Noël (2005), Based on the 1914 Christmas truce.
 Passchendaele (2006), movie directed by and starring Paul Gross
 Flyboys (2006), Movie directed by Tony Bill, tells the story of American pilots who volunteered for the French military before America entered World War I.
 War Horse (2011), movie directed by Steven Spielberg, adaptation of British author Michael Morpurgo's 1982 novel.
 1917 (2019), movie directed by Sam Mendes, tells the story of two soldiers going to send a message during the war..

Legacy and aftermath
 Agnew, Kate, and Geoff Fox (2001). Children at War: From the First World War to the Gulf. New York and London: Continuum International Publishing. 
 Black, Jeremy (2011). The Great War and the Making of the Modern World. New York and London: Continuum International Publishing. 
 Chickering, Roger, and Stig Forster, eds. (2003). Shadows of Total War: Europe, East Asia, and the United States, 1919-1939'''. West Nyack, NY: Cambridge University Press. 
 Kuhlman, Erika (2012). Of Little Comfort: War Widows, Fallen Soldiers, and the Remaking of Nation after the Great War. New York: NYU Press. 
 MacMillan, Margaret (2003). Paris 1919: Six Months That Changed the World. New York: Random House. 
 Rachamimov, Alon (2002). Legacy of the Great War, POWs and the Great War: Captivity on the Eastern Front. Oxford: Berg Publishers. 
 Reynolds, David (2014). The Long Shadow: The Legacies of the Great War in the Twentieth Century. New York and London: W. W. Norton & Company. 
 Seipp, Adam R. (2009). Ordeal of Peace: Demobilisation and the Urban Experience in Britain and Germany, 1917-1921. Abingdon: Ashgate Publishing Ltd. 
 Sharp, Alan (2011). Consequences of Peace: The Versailles Settlement-Aftermath and Legacy 1919-2010. New York: Haus Publishing. 
 Tate, Trudi (2013). Modernism, History and the First World War. Penrith: Humanities-Ebooks, LLP. 
 Winter, Jay (2009). Legacy of the Great War: Ninety Years On. Columbia, MO: University of Missouri Press. 

Historiography and memory
 
 Bessel, Richard; Wierling, Dorothee, eds. Inside World War One? The First World War and Its Witnesses (Oxford UP, 2018); online review
 
 Cornelissen, Christoph, and Arndt Weinrich, eds. Writing the Great War - The Historiography of World War I from 1918 to the Present (2020) online free
 Deak, John. (2014). "The Great War and the Forgotten Realm: The Habsburg Monarchy and the First World War" Journal of Modern History (2014) 86#2 pp: 336–380.
 Fussell, Paul (2013). The Great War and Modern Memory. New York: Oxford University Press. 
 
 Jones, Heather. (2013). "As the centenary approaches: the regeneration of First World War historiography." Historical Journal (2013) 56#3 pp: 857–878.
 Jones, Heather. (2014). "Goodbye to all that?: Memory and Meaning in the Commemoration of the First World War." Juncture (2014) 20#4 pp: 287–291.
  Excerpt
 Kramer, Alan. (2014a and 2014b). "Recent Historiography of the First World War - Part I," Journal of Modern European History (Feb. 2014) 12#1 pp 5–27; "Recent Historiography of the First World War (Part II)," (May 2014) 12#2 pp 155–174
 Millier, Alisa, Laura Rowe, and James Kitchen (2011). Other Combatants, Other Fronts: Competing Histories of the First World War. Newcastle upon Tyne: Cambridge Scholars Publishing. 
 Petrone, Karen (2011). Great War in Russian Memory. Bloomington: Indiana University Press. 
 
  Excerpt and text search
 
 Sanborn, Joshua. (2013). "Russian Historiography on the Origins of the First World War Since the Fischer Controversy." Journal of Contemporary History (2013) 48#2 pp: 350–362.
 Sharp, Heather. (2014). "Representing Australia's Involvement in the First World War: Discrepancies between Public Discourses and School History Textbooks from 1916 to 1936." Journal of Educational Media, Memory, and Society (2014) 6#1 pp: 1-23.
 Sked, Alan. "Austria-Hungary and the First World War." Histoire Politique 1 (2014): 16–49. online free
 Trout, Steven (2010). On the Battlefield of Memory: The First World War and American Remembrance, 1919-1941. Tuscaloosa: University of Alabama Press. 
 
 Vance, Jonathan F. (1997). Death So Noble: Memory, Meaning, and the First World War. Vancouver, BC: University of British Columbia Press. 
 Winter, Jay, and Antoine Prost (2005). The Great War in History: Debates and Controversies, 1914 to the Present. New York: Cambridge University Press. 
 Winter, Jay (2006). Remembering War: The Great War Between Memory and History in the Twentieth Century. New Haven, CT: Yale University Press. 
 Winter, Jay, ed. (2014). The Cambridge History of the First World War (2 vol. Cambridge University Press, 2014) 
 Woodward, David ed. America and World War I: A Selected Annotated Bibliography of English-Language Sources'' (2nd ed. 2007) excerpt
 Durchleuchtung eines Verrats. Der Fall des Oberst Alexandru D. Sturdza, von Petre Otu und Maria Georgescu. Lektor Verlag. 2022. Hainburg. ISBN 9783941866089
 Alexandru Averescu - Marschall, Politiker, Legende, von Petre Otu. Lektor Verlag. Hainburg. 2012. ISBN 9783941866027

See also

 Bibliography of Canadian military history
 Bibliography of United States military history
 Causes of World War I
 Historiography of the causes of World War I
 American entry into World War I
 Austro-Hungarian entry into World War I
 British entry into World War I
 French entry into World War I
 Italian entry into World War I
 Japanese entry into World War I
 Russian entry into World War I
 Diplomatic history of World War I
 Economic history of World War I
 International relations of the Great Powers (1814–1919)
 Allies of World War I
 Central Powers
 Home front during World War I covering all major countries
 Economic history of World War I
 Propaganda in World War I
 British propaganda during World War I
 Italian propaganda during World War I
 Opposition to World War I
 World War I casualties
 World War I in popular culture
 World War I in literature
 Fiction based on World War I
 British women's literature of World War I

External links
 1914-1918-online. International Encyclopedia of the First World War
 Booknotes interview with Michael Howard on The First World War, March 16, 2003.
 collection of Great War novels

Books
Bibliographies of wars and conflicts